| tries = {{#expr: 
 
 + 8 + 5 + 4 + 4 + 10 + 3 + 5 + 5
 + 8 + 5 + 6 + 6 + 6 + 7 + 4 + 7
 + 6 + 6 + 4 + 7 + 5 + 3 + 4 + 5
 + 0 + 9 + 5 + 5 + 3 + 3 + 2 + 12
 + 2 + 2
 + 3
}}
| top point scorer = 
| top try scorer = 
| venue = Sixways Stadium
| attendance2 = 11,895
| champions = Leicester Tigers
| count = 7
| runner-up = Northampton Saints
| website = www.lv.com
| previous year = 2010–11
| previous tournament = 2010–11 LV Cup
| next year = 2012–13
| next tournament = 2012–13 LV Cup
}}

The 2011–12 LV Cup (styled as the LV= Cup) was the 41st season of England's national rugby union cup competition, and the seventh to follow the Anglo-Welsh format.

The competition consisted of the four Welsh Pro12 teams and the 12 English Premiership clubs arranged into pools consisting of three English and one Welsh team. Teams were guaranteed two home and two away pool matches, with teams in Pools 1 and 4 playing each other and teams in Pools 2 and 3 playing each other, with the top team from each pool qualifying for the semi finals. The competition took place during the autumn soon after the World Cup and on international fixture dates during the Six Nations, thus allowing teams to develop their squad players.

The defending champions were Gloucester, who this season failed to progress from the pool stage.

Pool stages

Points system 
The points scoring system for the pool stages will be as follows:
4 points for a win
2 points for a draw
1 bonus point for scoring four or more tries in a match (TB)
1 bonus point for a loss by seven points or less (LB)

Pool 1 v Pool 4 
Tables

Round 1

Round 2

Round 3

Round 4 

This match was postponed due to a frozen pitch at Rodney Parade. The LV= Organising Committee subsequently awarded the match to Saracens by 20 points to nil (a bonus point win). Dragons were also fined £10,000 (suspended) for their failure under LV= Cup Regulation 6.7 (that the pitch was unplayable and no suitable alternative arrangements were in place). Dragons appealed this decision and their appeal was upheld. The decision was quashed, with the match instead being recorded as a 0–0 draw and the suspended fine reduced from £10,000 to £5,000.

Pool 2 v Pool 3 
Tables

Round 1

Round 2

Round 3

Round 4

Knockout stage

Qualification criteria 
The top teams from each pool qualify for the knockout stages. The pool winners will be decided by the following criteria:
1. The pool winner will be the club with the highest number of match points in each pool. The pool winners will be ranked 1 to 4 by reference to the number of match points earned in the pools.
2. If two or more clubs in the same pool end the pool stage equal on match points, then the order in which they have finished will be determined by:
i. the greater number of matches won by the club and
ii. if the number of matches won is equal, the club with the greater total number of tries scored and
iii. if the total number of tries scored is equal, the club with the greater points difference (points scored for, less points scored against) and
iv. if the points difference is equal, the club with the fewer number of red cards and
v. if the number of red cards is the same, by the toss a coin.

Each of the four qualifying clubs shall be ranked as above and shall play each other as follows: 
Semi-final 1 – 1st ranked club v 4th ranked club
Semi-final 2 – 2nd ranked club v 3rd ranked club
The first club listed in each of the semi-final matches shall be the home club.

Semi-finals

Final

See also 
2011–12 English Premiership (rugby union)
2011–12 Pro 12

External links 
 
 Anglo Welsh Cup on Premiership Rugby website
 Tables
 Fixtures and results
 Anglo Welsh Cup website

References 

2011–12 in Welsh rugby union
2011–12 English Premiership (rugby union)
2011-12
2011–12 rugby union tournaments for clubs